Göldağı can refer to:

 Göldağı, Gölpazarı
 Göldağı, Şabanözü